The División de Honor Femenina 2012–13 was the 56th season of women's handball top flight in Spain since its establishment. Itxako four times champion, is the defending champion. The season began on Saturday, 8 September 2012. The last matchday was played on Saturday, 11 May 2013. A total of 14 teams contested the league, 10 of which had already contested in the 2011–12 season, and four of which were promoted from the División de Plata 2011–12.

Bera Bera won their first División de Honor title ever. Bera Bera clinched its first title by winning in the last matchday to Castro Urdiales 18–32.

Promotion and relegation 
Teams promoted from 2011–12 División de Plata
Valencia Aicequip
Prosetecnisa Zuazo
Mecalia Atl. Guardés
Castelldefels

Teams relegated to 2011–12 División de Plata
Elda
UCAM Murcia
Gijón

Teams dissolved
BM Sagunto

Teams

Standings

Top goalscorers

See also
Liga ASOBAL 2012–13

References

External links
Royal Spanish Handball Federation

División de Honor Femenina de Balonmano seasons
Division de Honor
2012–13 domestic handball leagues
2012 in women's handball
2013 in women's handball